These are the results of the women's K-1 500 metres competition in canoeing at the 1948 Summer Olympics.  The K-1 event is raced by single-person canoe sprint kayaks. Heat and semifinals took place on August 12.

Medalists

Heats
The ten competitors first raced in two heats.  The top four finishers in both heats moved directly to the final.

Final

References

1948 Summer Olympics official report. p. 316.
Sports-reference.com women's 1948 K-1 500 m results.

Women's K-1 500
Olympic
Women's events at the 1948 Summer Olympics